Abbasabad (also Romanized as ‘Abbāsābād; also known as ‘Abbāsābād-e Behī) is a village in Behi Dehbokri Rural District, Simmineh District, Bukan County, West Azerbaijan Province, Iran. At the 2006 census, its population was 81, in 16 families.

References 

Populated places in Bukan County